Vann Lake and Ockley Woods is a  biological Site of Special Scientific Interest south of Ockley in Surrey. Vann Lake is part of Vann Lake and Candy's Copse, a nature reserve managed by the Surrey Wildlife Trust.

This site has a lake and ancient woodland which is botanically rich, especially for mosses, liverworts and fungi. There are diverse species of breeding birds and invertebrates include the rare Molophilus lackschewitzianus cranefly and purple emperor and silver-washed fritillary butterflies. There is also a population of dormice.

References

Surrey Wildlife Trust
Sites of Special Scientific Interest in Surrey